Mount Odin is a mountain in British Columbia, Canada. The mountain was likely named by George Dawson as his map contains the earliest known appearance of the name.

See also
 Highest mountain peaks of Canada
 List of the most prominent summits of North America
 Most isolated mountain peaks of Canada

References

External links
 "Mount Odin, British Columbia" on Peakbagger

Odin
Odin
Kootenay Land District